The 1985–86 FIS Cross-Country World Cup was the 5th official World Cup season in cross-country skiing for men and women. The World Cup began in Labrador City, Canada, on 7 December 1985 and finished in Oslo, Norway, on 15 March 1986. Gunde Svan of Sweden won the overall men's cup, and Marjo Matikainen of Finland won the women's.

Before the season began, after several years of disagreements between athletes and federations concerning what styles of skiing should be allowed, it was decided that cross-country skiing should have two disciplines: classical and freestyle. The initiative to this idea was made by the Swedish skier Thomas Wassberg.

Race calendar

Men

Women

Men's team events

Women's team events

Overall standings

Men

Women

Medal table

Achievements
First World Cup career victory

Men
  Torgny Mogren, 22, in his 3rd season - the WC 4 (5 km F) in Bohinj; also first podium
  Vladimir Smirnov, 21, in his 4th season - the WC 6 (15 km C) in Kavgolovo; first podium was 1983–84 WC 10 (15 km) in Murmansk

Women
  Marjo Matikainen, 20, in her 2nd season – the WC 1 (5 km F) in Labrador City; also first podium
  Gaby Nestler, 18, in her 3rd season – the WC 3 (10 km F) in Les Saisies; also first podium
  Simone Opitz, 23, in her 2nd season – the WC 4 (20 km F) in Nove Mesto; first podium was 1985–86 WC 3 (10 km F) in Les Saisies
  Marianne Dahlmo, 21, in her 2nd season – the WC 5 (20 km C) in Oberstdorf; first podium was 1984–85 WC 9 (5 km) in Lahti
  Anne Jahren, 22, in her 5th season – the WC 6 (10 km C) in Kavgolovo; first podium was 1982–83 WC 3 (10 km) in Stachy Zadow
  Jaana Savolainen, 23, in her 3rd season – the WC 9 (10 km F) in Oslo; first podium was 1985–86 WC 1 (5 km F) in Labrador City

Victories in this World Cup (all-time number of victories as of 1985/86 season in parentheses)

Men
 , 5 (16) first places
 , 2 (2) first places
 , 1 (1) first place
 , 1 (4) first place

Women
 , 2 (8) first places
 , 2 (2) first places
 , 1 (1) first place
 , 1 (1) first place
 , 1 (1) first place
 , 1 (1) first place
 , 1 (1) first place

References

FIS Cross-Country World Cup seasons
World Cup 1985-86
World Cup 1985-86